Nils Duerinck (born 20 March 1984) is a retired Belgian sprint athlete who specialized in the 400 meters hurdles.

Achievements

References

External links
 

1984 births
Living people
Belgian male sprinters
Athletes (track and field) at the 2012 Summer Olympics
Olympic athletes of Belgium
World Athletics Championships athletes for Belgium